Rumors is a farcical play by Neil Simon that premiered in 1988.

Plot summary
The play starts with Ken Gorman and his wife, Chris Gorman, at the 10th anniversary party of Charlie Brock, the Deputy Mayor of New York, and his wife, Myra. Unfortunately, things are not going quite to plan. All the kitchen staff are gone, Myra is missing, and Charlie has shot himself in the head. Chris calls Charlie's doctor, but before Chris can tell him what has happened, Ken dictates that she not inform the doctor of anything that has happened, for the bullet only went through Charlie's ear lobe. It appeared that he had taken some Valium, and was falling asleep as he fired the gun, managing to miss his head.

Chris gets off the phone with Dr. Dudley just as the doorbell rings. Chris opens the door and lets in Lenny and Claire Ganz, also friends of the Brocks. Lenny and Claire have just been in a car accident, and Lenny calls his doctor, who also happens to be Dr. Dudley, to ask him about his neck. Claire and Lenny exchange rumors that they have heard about Charlie and Myra, both convinced that one is having an affair. Finally they confront Ken, who lets them in on the situation. Lenny declares they should call the police, but Ken disagrees. Before they can agree on anything, another car shows up. Ken goes back upstairs to Charlie's bedroom, and Claire opens the door to let in Ernie Cusack, a psychologist, and his eccentric wife Cookie. Claire, Chris, and Lenny engage the Cusacks in conversation, not telling them about the situation with Charlie.

Suddenly, a gunshot is heard. Ken comes out of the upstairs bedroom and requests Chris' presence, while Lenny distracts the Cusacks, then goes upstairs to check on the problem. It turns out Ken was taking the gun away, tripped on Charlie's slippers and accidentally fired the gun, which has made him almost deaf. As the Cusacks prepare dinner, the final guests arrive, Glenn, a politician running for State Senate, and Cassie Cooper, who have a very strained relationship and argue constantly. Act I closes as the Cusacks come out with a steaming dinner, Cassie furiously berates Glenn for making her drop a crystal in the toilet, Chris trips on a telephone wire, Lenny's neck goes out, Cookie has a back spasm, and a very deaf Ken sits in absolute confusion.

Act II begins as dinner ends, the Cusacks and Coopers having been told the entirety of the situation. The guests decide to place blame for the situation on Ken. Cassie attempts to make Glenn jealous by blatantly flirting with Ken, indirectly clearing Ken's ears in the process. A mysterious woman, who Claire and Chris assume to be Myra, calls the house asking for Glenn. Things get serious as a police car pulls up the driveway. The guests furiously debate what to do, and decide to pretend that they hadn't noticed anything was wrong, claiming "had the music on too loud to hear the gunshots". Just to be safe, the men decide for Lenny to play Charlie if the policeman asks for him, and for Ken to play Lenny. The policeman, Officer Welch, enters and interrogates them, and quickly gets suspicious as their story unravels. It turns out the policeman was just investigating Lenny's car accident, and no one is in trouble, but Glenn accidentally reveals the gunshot situation just as the officer begins to leave, only to get a call on his walkie-talkie about an incident involving gunshots near the scene.

Now angered by what he has learned, Welch demands to see Charlie, and a disgruntled Lenny comes downstairs to "explain everything". Lenny, at first unsure what to possibly say, eventually gets carried away in his monologue and invents a ludicrous, rambling explanation for everything, culminating in a claim that Myra is in the basement. Welch, partly out of exasperation, buys the story and leaves the house. The guests, elated at their escape, begin to troop upstairs to speak with Charlie and find out the story once and for all, but are delayed when they hear Myra call up from the basement.

Background
In an interview, Simon said: " 'I was going through some difficult times...I wanted to work, because work is always a cathartic process for me, and I thought it would be really good just to get into a comedy.' "

He noted that "This is completely different for me...It's unlike anything I've ever written. It's my first farce." In describing the play, he said "The play started with the idea of doing a farce...The next thing was to do it as an elegant farce, because the farces in Moliere's days were generally about wealthy people. These aren't extremely wealthy people, but they are well-to-do. So I decided to dress them in evening clothes. There was something about having them dressed in evening clothes that I thought was a nice counterpoint to the chaos that was happening in the play. And so I picked a reason for them to be dressed elegantly, and it was a 10th anniversary."

Production history
Rumors premiered at the Old Globe Theatre (San Diego, California) on September 22, 1988.

Rumors opened on Broadway at the Broadhurst Theatre on November 17, 1988  and transferred to the Ethel Barrymore Theatre where it closed after 535 performances and eight previews. Directed by Gene Saks, the original cast included Mark Nelson, Lisa Banes, Christine Baranski, Andre Gregory, Ken Howard, Ron Leibman, Joyce Van Patten, and Jessica Walter. The scenery was by Tony Straiges, costumes by Joseph G. Aulisi, and lighting by Tharon Musser. The song "La Bamba" was required to be used in the play.

Veronica Hamel, Dick Latessa, Larry Linville, and Alice Playten were among the cast replacements throughout the run.

Baranski won the Tony Award for Best Performance by a Featured Actress in a Play, and Joseph G. Aulisi was nominated for the Drama Desk Award for Outstanding Costume Design.

A reading was held in September 2013, directed by Kathleen Marshall and starring Martin Short, Matthew Broderick, Andrea Martin and Julie White, with the possibility of a Broadway production. In March 2016, Independent Theatre Pakistan mounted a production in Lahore, Pakistan.

References

External links

1988 plays
Plays by Neil Simon